Avipeda is a Mesozoic bird ichnogenus. It is similar to the ichnogenus Aquatilavipes, but has shorter and thicker toe prints.

See also
 Aviadactyla

Footnotes

References
 McCrea, R. T. and W. A S. Sarjeant. 2001. New ichnotaxa of bird and mammal footprints from the Lower Cretaceous (Albian) Gates Formation of Alberta; pp. 453–478 in D. H. Tanke, and K. Carpenter, (eds.), Mesozoic Vertebrate Life. Indiana University Press, Bloomington and Indianapolis.

Mesozoic birds
Bird trace fossils